Fisher Hall may refer to:

Avery Fisher Hall, a concert hall in New York City
Fisher Hall (Miami University), formerly listed on the National Register of Historic Places in Butler County, Ohio
Fisher Hall (San Marcos, Texas), listed on the National Register of Historic Places in Hays County, Texas
Fisher Hall (University of Notre Dame), a residential hall

See also
Fisher House (disambiguation)

Architectural disambiguation pages